Percy Baynes was Manager of the Flight Software Program at NASA during the 1970s. He monitored the development, performance and management of flight software, and was formerly chief of the Spacecraft Control Programming Section at Goddard Space Flight Center in Greenbelt, Maryland. Mr. Baynes graduated from Howard University with Bachelor of Science and Master of Science degrees in math, and has 4 children with his wife Dorothy.

References 

Year of birth missing (living people)
NASA people
Howard University alumni
Living people